Burt M. Henson (May 28, 1926 – January 30, 2003) served in the California State Assembly for the 37th district from 1963 to 1966. During World War II also he served in the United States Navy.

References

United States Navy personnel of World War II
Democratic Party members of the California State Assembly
1926 births
2003 deaths